The first season of the AMC western-drama television series Hell on Wheels premiered on November 6, 2011 and concluded on January 15, 2012, comprising 10 episodes. The series was created and produced by Joe and Tony Gayton, who wrote four episodes. They also served as the series' showrunners. The series' executive producers include the Gaytons, Jeremy Gold, John Shiban, and David Von Ancken.

The season follows Cullen Bohannon, a former Confederate soldier who works as a foreman on the railroad as he tries to track down the Union soldiers who murdered his wife. His quest leads him to the settlement that accompanied the construction of First Transcontinental Railroad, referred to as "Hell on Wheels" by the Union Pacific company men, laborers, mercenaries, prostitutes, support workers, surveyors, and others who make the mobile encampment their home.

The first season was met with favorable reviews from critics, and the premiere was watched by 4.4 million viewers – AMC’s second most watched series premiere in history, following The Walking Dead. In January 2012, following the season one finale, AMC put out a press release confirming Hell on Wheels as the network's second-highest rated original series behind The Walking Dead, averaging three million viewers per episode.

Cast

Main cast 
The first season has eight series regulars.

 Anson Mount as Cullen Bohannon, a former Confederate soldier who is determined to avenge the deaths of his son and his wife, Mary. (10 episodes)
 Colm Meaney as Thomas "Doc" Durant, a businessman and investor in the First Transcontinental Railroad, where he hopes to make his fortune. (10 episodes)
 Common as Elam Ferguson, a recently freed slave who is trying to find his place in the world. He works as security and general assistant to Bohannon. (10 episodes)
 Dominique McElligott as Lily Bell, a recent widow; her husband was a surveyor working on the transcontinental rail project. (10 episodes)
 Tom Noonan as Reverend Nathaniel Cole, a minister who formerly participated in Bleeding Kansas prior to the Civil War; he is sick of the slaughter and wants to help the whites and Indians avoid another war. (9 episodes)
 Eddie Spears as Joseph Black Moon, a Cheyenne who must choose between the new world and the traditions of his ancestors. (9 episodes)
 Ben Esler as Seán McGinnes, an ambitious young Irishman looking to make his fortune in the West. (7 episodes)
 Phil Burke as Mickey McGinnes, Seán's brother, who has travelled with Seán to America. (7 episodes)

Recurring cast

Production

Conception
On November 8, 2011, co-creator Joe Gayton spoke of the series' origins. "We [Tony and I] started talking and remembered this story, American Experience, which was this really great documentary, and I thought, 'God, that’s great. I just learned a bunch of stuff I had never learned before.' You just have this cursory information that the Chinese and the Irish built the railroad, but it got in underneath all the dirt and stuff that went on, with the financing of it, and the greed and corruption. And then, I heard about this Hell on Wheels place and I went, 'What a great setting for a western.' So, we pitched that to Jeremy Gold [at Endemol] and ended up taking it to AMC, and they loved it," he said.

Hell on Wheels was created by Joe and Tony Gayton in late 2008, and Endemol USA's scripted television division, headed by senior vice president of original programming Jeremy Gold, came on board to develop the series for AMC. On May 18, 2010, AMC placed a pilot order for Hell on Wheels with Endemol USA. Joe and Tony Gayton wrote the pilot, David Von Ancken was attached to the project as director, with Jeremy Gold, Joe Gayton and Tony Gayton serving as executive producers. On July 6, 2010, Endemol USA announced that they had entered into a partnership with Entertainment One, who would serve as the production studio on the project. Part of the deal between the two companies included provisions of international distribution, with Endemol retaining rights to the series across Europe, while Entertainment One acquired rights to Hell on Wheels in all remaining territories. As a result of the deal, Entertainment One also holds global rights for DVD and Blu-ray sales, as well as video-on-demand and other digital distribution services. The Canadian production company Nomadic Pictures was brought onto the project to serve as co-producers alongside Entertainment One. The pilot was delivered to AMC executives in November 2010. On November 12, 2010 it was reported by Deadline that the executives at AMC were impressed with the pilot, and, coupled with the fact that the network had just cancelled their drama series, Rubicon, were likely to order Hell on Wheels to series.

On December 15, 2010, AMC green-lighted the series with an order of 10 episodes. Along with the series pickup, AMC announced that Nomadic Pictures would again co-produce the series, as they had done for the pilot, with Mike Frislev and Chad Oakes joining the series as producers while John Shiban and David Von Ancken joined the series as executive producers; Von Ancken had previously served as director on the pilot. The network also announced that John Morayniss and Michael Rosenberg would oversee production for Entertainment One, while Joel Stillerman and Susie Fitzgerald would oversee production for AMC.

Filming
Filming of the first season took place in Calgary, as well as areas in central and southern Alberta, Canada. The T'suu T'ina Native Indian Reservation, an Indian reserve in southern Alberta, was the location for most of the exteriors.

Episodes

Reception

Critical reception

Hell On Wheels first season received "generally favorable" reviews from critics. Metacritic gave it a score of 63 out of 100 based on 27 reviews.  The Washington Posts Hank Stuever rated the show highly, commenting, "Hands down, the most intriguing show on the fall slate. Though imbued with epic sweep, 'Hell on Wheels' is a western at heart, even if that heart is cold. Plenty of guns, knives, arrows, scalpings – mixed with the incendiary socio-psychological wounds left in the Civil War’s wake."  Robert Lloyd of the Los Angeles Times says the show "takes its cues more from the movies than from life ... Still, for all the unlikely things [the creators] make happen in order to get their characters into place, and the dogged refusal of a couple of those characters to become interesting at all, the show gathers steam as it goes on."  The Wall Street Journals Nancy Dewolf Smith considers the series "like a bag of unpolished stones ... Despite striking performances even in many of the smaller roles, the actors sometimes are made to symbolize very modern obsessions, e.g., with race and gender."  Brian Lowry of Variety thinks "while the diverse mix of characters could work to the program's advantage over the long haul, jumping to and fro among them creates a diluted, herky-jerky ride in the early going."<ref name="Lowry">Lowry, Brian. Hell on Wheels, Variety, November 3, 2011.</ref>

Ratings

The pilot premiered on November 6. 2011. It was watched by 4.4 million viewers – AMC’s second-highest series premiere in history, following The Walking Dead. Among key demographics, the pilot episode delivered 2.4 million viewers in adults 18–49. Among adults 25–54, it delivered 2.3 million viewers, according to Nielsen. The total viewership bested network slot rivals CSI: Miami or Pan Am. The sixth episode was watched by 2.15 million viewers, the lowest viewership of the first season and had a 0.6 rating with the 18-49 age range. The viewership numbers eventually rebounded with the season one finale being watched by 2.84 million viewers and maintained its steady 0.7 rating with the 18-49 age range. In January 2012, following the season one finale, AMC put out a press release confirming Hell on Wheels as the network's second-highest rated original series behind The Walking Dead, averaging three million viewers per episode.

Home media release

DVD and Blu-ray sets
In May 2012, AMC released the first season of Hell on Wheels in DVD and Blu-ray Disc formats. Entitled "Hell on Wheels - The Complete 1st Season", the package includes three discs that contain all 10 episodes; extras such as "Recreating the Past: The Making of Hell on Wheels''", "Crashing a Train: From Concept to Camera"; and episode, character, and making-of featurettes; as well as behind-the-scenes footage.

Soundtrack
In August 2012, the network released the soundtrack from the first season, featuring the Emmy-nominated theme song by Gustavo Santaolalla and music by Kevin Kiner. It is only available on iTunes for now.

References

External links 
 
 

Fiction set in 1865
Hell on Wheels (TV series)
 
2011 American television seasons
2012 American television seasons